Hutchison School is a private, independent college preparatory day school for girls age 2 through 12th grade located in Memphis, Tennessee US.

History 
Hutchison School was founded by Mary Grimes Hutchison in 1902.

Academics
Hutchison offers a college preparatory program with opportunities in arts, athletics, leadership, community service, entrepreneurship, technology and innovation, wellness, internships/fellowships, pre-professional art certifications, etc.

References

External links
 Hutchison School

Girls' schools in Tennessee
Preparatory schools in Tennessee
Private K-12 schools in Tennessee
Schools in Memphis, Tennessee